Vigneshwaran Baskaran (born 11 April 1990) is an Indian professional footballer who plays as a goalkeeper for I-League club Gokulam Kerala.

Club career
Born in Pudukkottai, Tamil Nadu, Baskaran began his career playing with lower league clubs such as Fateh Hyderabad and Sudeva Delhi before joining Punjab FC. He then joined I-League club Chennai City for the 2017–18 season. Baskaran made his professional debut for the club on 20 January 2018 against Gokulam Kerala, starting in a 0–1 defeat.

After a season with Chennai City, Baskaran moved to Churchill Brothers. He made his debut for the club on 15 November 2018 against Shillong Lajong, starting in a 4–2 victory. In 2019, Baskaran joined Calcutta Football League club Southern Samity for the season.

On 2 August 2019, Baskaran joined I-League club Gokulam Kerala. He made his debut for the club on 4 January 2020 against Aizawl, starting in a 1–1 draw.

Career statistics

Honours
Gokulam Kerala
Durand Cup: 2019
 I-League: 2021–22

References

External links
 Profile at the All India Football Federation

1990 births
Living people
People from Pudukkottai
Indian footballers
Association football goalkeepers
Fateh Hyderabad A.F.C. players
Sudeva Delhi FC players
RoundGlass Punjab FC players
Chennai City FC players
Churchill Brothers FC Goa players
Gokulam Kerala FC players
I-League players
Footballers from Tamil Nadu